The Bristol, Connecticut police killings occurred on October 12, 2022, when two law enforcement officers from the Bristol Police Department were shot and killed and another wounded while responding to a 911 call of a domestic dispute.

The Bristol Police Department answered a domestic violence call at 10:42 pm in Bristol, Connecticut and three officers arrived on the scene. All three officers went to the side door of the house to speak to Nathan Bructher. When officers ordered Nathan to step outside of the house with his hands up, his brother, Nicholas Bructher, wearing all camouflage, opened fire from behind the officers using his licensed AR-15., killing Sergeant Dustin DeMonte and Officer Alex Hamzy, and wounding Officer Alec Iurato in his leg. Iurato retreated around the house to a Bristol police cruiser where he propped himself up and returned fire with one shot from his service pistol, striking and killing Nicholas. Approximately 80 shots were fired during the incident.

Tributes to the officers 
In 11 days, over $1 million were raised in support of the fallen officers and their families. As of the end of October, over 100 people come to pay respects to the memorial outside of the Bristol Police Department headquarters daily. Along with this, the names of DeMonte and Hamzy became the 149th and 150th names memorialized at the Connecticut Police Academy in Meriden, Connecticut.

During a Miami Dolphins game, the team honored DeMonte, who had been a lifelong Dolphins fan. Along with the Dolphins, the New England Patriots also paid tribute to DeMonte and Hamzy on Twitter.

Funeral services 
 
On October 21, 2022, in East Hartford, Connecticut, close to 10,000 law enforcement officers and supporters from all across the US and even as far as Canada came to attend the funeral service for the fallen officers.

During the funeral service, Sergeant DeMonte and Officer Hamzy were posthumously promoted to lieutenant and sergeant, respectively. DeMonte served ten years of service and Hamzy served eight years of service for the Bristol Police Department.

Connecticut Governor Ned Lamont attended the funeral. "Lt. DeMonte and Sgt. Hamzy are heroes and served with integrity and courage. We will forever keep them and their families in our hearts," Lamont said during his speech.

The funeral service ended with a helicopter flyover and bagpipers playing "Amazing Grace".

References 

2022 in Connecticut
American police officers killed in the line of duty
Bristol, Connecticut
Events in Hartford County, Connecticut